North Hatley is a village of 675 people (2021 Census), located at the north end of Lake Massawippi. It is part of the Memphrémagog Regional County Municipality in the Eastern Townships region of Quebec, Canada, also known as Estrie or Cantons de l'Est in French.

Locals usually have to drive to the nearby towns of Magog or Sherbrooke to find big-city amenities, although there are smaller stores and cafés in the town which are open year-round. Those include Emporium (antiques), The Pomegranate (antiques), LeBaron's Store (grocery store and gift shop), The Pilsen Pub, and Accommodation Massawippi (convenience store) among others.

History
Many of the first settlers around North Hatley were United Empire Loyalists, mostly farmers, who left New England in the years following the American Declaration of Independence in 1776.

The village owes most of its great houses and particular architecture  to its first aristocrats, and mostly Americans from south of the Mason–Dixon line.

Demographics 

Local government
List of former mayors:

 Stephan Doré (2001–2009)
 Michael Page (2009–2021)
 Marcella Davis Gerrish (2021–Present)

In media
North Hatley was the location for the shooting of a few films,  including Secret Window with Johnny Depp,.

North Hatley was mentioned in the television show The X-Files as the location of the Cigarette Smoking Man's hideout (in the episode "The Red and the Black").

North Hatley was the setting for the 2003 film Hatley High. Some of its landmarks, including the North Hatley sign, can be seen throughout the movie. However, the bulk of the movie was filmed in Hudson.

Notable people
Several Canadian Modernist poets, including F. R. Scott, Louis Dudek, Ralph Gustafson, Ronald Sutherland, and D. G. Jones, have lived in North Hatley.

It is also home to many artists and craftspeople, including Emily LeBaron, an artist, antiquarian, art teacher and community organizer, and also Naisi LeBaron, known locally for her "art naive" paintings of village life in North Hatley and environs, as well as local graphic artist Mellanie Beauchamp.

North Hatley also has in its history philanthropists well committed to their community, such as Arthur Russell Virgin and Janet Blake.

See also 
 List of village municipalities in Quebec

References

External links 

 Official site

Villages in Quebec
Incorporated places in Estrie